Fernand Bisson de La Roque (30 June 1885 in Bourseville (Somme) – 1 May 1958) was a French Egyptologist and archaeologist. His notable excavations include
1921 to 1924 at Djédefrê pyramid at Abu Rawash, 1925 to 1932 at the Temple of Monthu at Medamud, northeast of Thebes and 1933 to 1950 at the Temple of Montu in Tod at Tod (formerly Djerty) southeast of Thebes.

Publications
Rapport sur les fouilles d'Abou-Roasch, Cairo, Institut français d'archéologie orientale, 1922, 1923, 1924

References
[ BIFAO 58 (1959), p. 175-184 Étienne Drioton, Jean Sainte Fare Garnot Nécrologie. Une vie exemplaire : Fernand Bisson de La Roque (1885-1958)]

French Egyptologists
French archaeologists
20th-century archaeologists
1885 births
1958 deaths
People from Somme (department)
Members of the Institut Français d'Archéologie Orientale